John Africa (July 26, 1931 – May 13, 1985), born Vincent Leaphart, was the founder of MOVE, a Philadelphia-based, predominantly black organization active from the early 1970s and still active. He and his followers were killed at a residential home, which served as the headquarters of MOVE, in a fire after the Philadelphia Police Department bombed the house with C4-explosive, and deliberately let the fire rage until it was out of control following a standoff and firefight between MOVE and police.

Life 
Born Vincent Leaphart on July 26, 1931, in the Mantua neighborhood of West Philadelphia. His father, Frederick Leaphart was a handyman while his mother Lennie Mae was a homemaker. He was one of ten children. Lennie Mae died suddenly in her early 40s, and Africa would later blame the hospital for her death. As a child he was "painfully thin" and underweight. At age 9 he was transferred to a school for slow learners to learn simple trades. He would continue to struggle in school and dropped out at age 16.

Drafted by the US Army during the Korean War, Leaphart would serve over a year in an infantry unit. He would later remark on the contrast between the sunrise over the Korean mountains and the ugly gunfire of war. Upon his return he met Dorothy Clark and they were married shortly thereafter at the age of 29. She would later describe their marriage as ordinary and friends described Leaphart as levelheaded and dependable, also noting that Dorothy would help him with his reading and writing skills.

In 1971 he moved his family to Powelton, a polyglot neighborhood in West Philadelphia, close to the University of Pennsylvania. Community Housing Inc., was a cooperative in which members pooled money together to buy a handful of buildings to live in with an idea to rebel against an oppressive society that bulldozed homes to make way to build more academic housing. Although the area had a large majority of academic residents, Leaphart was seen as eccentric yet tolerable as the area was diverse. Faced with foreclosure, the co-op stepped in and purchased his home so he could remain living there. In 1972, Leaphart changed his name to John Africa to represent the continent where life began.

Africa managed to attract people in Philadelphia area who were willing to believe in his ideologies. He later met Donald Glassey, a social worker from the University of Pennsylvania, who was so intrigued by Africa's teachings that he volunteered to write and compile the illiterate Africa's thoughts into a book. Glassey's notes were eventually the basis of a document called "The Guidelines". With Glassey, Africa moved his new organization to a house on Pearl Street in West Philadelphia. After parting ways with Glassey due to differing ideology, Africa made "The Guidelines" the primary source for his teachings and the principles of MOVE, founded in 1972 as Christian Movement for Life. The Guidelines articulated teachings such as strict vegetarianism and the inherent value of all living things.

MOVE accepted members regardless of their past and taught lessons on corruption, racism, and the need for individuality in an increasingly technological society. Further, the organization protested animal cruelty in zoos, the education system, and police brutality. Consequently, the police engaged in heavy surveillance around members of MOVE. According to Let the Fire Burn, a documentary released in 2013, a member of the Philadelphia police revealed that between 1972 and 1978, 193 arrests of MOVE members and 93 subsequent court cases occurred.

On August 8, 1978, the Philadelphia police attempted to evict the MOVE organization from their home on Pearl Street. A standoff occurred, resulting in an eventual shootout, and the death of one police officer, James J. Ramp, as well as several injuries. Nine MOVE members were arrested and the organization was removed from their home on Pearl Street. The home was immediately demolished and the "MOVE 9" were convicted over the police officer's death. Merle Africa and Phil Africa died in the Pennsylvania prison system.  The last of the remaining members were released in February 2020.

Glassey, after being found in possession of weapons, was later arrested. He implicated Africa and other MOVE members in various crimes. On July 23, 1981, in a Philadelphia federal court, Africa and his co-defendant Alfonso Africa (representing themselves) were tried and acquitted on weapons and conspiracy charges by a jury that deliberated for almost six days.

After MOVE, John Africa moved to a new location on Osage Ave. in West Philadelphia, law enforcement officials obtained permission from the Mayor's office to evict members of MOVE due to neighborhood complaints of obscenity and arrest warrants. On May 13, 1985, they attempted to evict MOVE and execute arrest warrants. Non-compliance by MOVE developed into an armed standoff and firefight.

Eleven MOVE members, including John Africa, five other adults and five children died in the resulting fire. Although the members were all huddled in the basement with access to a back alley, the alley was under police gunfire. The lone surviving woman described bullets flying all around during her first escape attempt, and the lone surviving child described hearing the sound of automatic gunfire when they tried to flee from the fire. Police officers at the scene denied these claims. Only Ramona and Birdie Africa survived, though both suffered severe burns. Birdie was released but Ramona was convicted and sentenced to serve the maximum sentence of 7 years in prison. She served the full time. Despite the fact that the Philadelphia Police and Fire Departments were found guilty of negligence by the Philadelphia Special Investigation Commission (MOVE) no criminal charges were ever filed against any of the perpetrators of the bombing, arson, and resulting deaths.

Teachings
John Africa has been classified as an anarcho-primitivist. His teachings emphasized the importance of all life and the ways in which capitalism, war, racism, and other social forces serve as direct opposition to this reality. He encouraged strict vegetarianism, raw food, and communal living. According to MOVE's website, "John Africa despises prejudice, despised the man-made standard of inferior-superior," and "John Africa teach MOVE people to believe in and love life, to understand the absolute necessity of life and protect all life equally, meaning all living beings (people, animals, water, soil, air)".

Influence on others
Philadelphia activist Mumia Abu-Jamal has followed the teachings of John Africa, and was a supporter of the MOVE organization. During Abu-Jamal's 1982 murder trial for the death of a police officer, Abu-Jamal made repeated requests to be represented by Africa. The judge denied these requests as Africa was not a licensed attorney.

See also
Black nationalism
Development criticism

References

1931 births
1985 deaths
Activists from Philadelphia
African-American anarchists
African-American United States Army personnel
American anti-capitalists
American environmentalists
Anarcho-primitivists
Deaths from fire in the United States
Founders of new religious movements
Political activists from Pennsylvania
United States Army personnel of the Korean War
United States Army soldiers
African Americans in the Korean War